The Other Chet Atkins is the thirteenth studio album by American guitarist Chet Atkins. It is an unusual and notable album for him in that the entire album features Chet playing an acoustic nylon-string (Spanish) guitar and there is no country music.

Track listing

Side one

 "Begin the Beguine" (Cole Porter) – 3:21
 "Sabrosa" (René Touzet) – 2:07
 "Yours" (Gonzalo Roig, Jack Sherr) – 2:32
 "Siboney" (Ernesto Lecuona) – 2:06
 "The Streets of Laredo" (Traditional) – 2:41
 "Delicado" (Waldir Azevedo) – 2:21

Side two

 "Peanut Vendor" (Moisés Simmons) – 2:20
 "El Relicario" (Jose Padilla) – 2:04
 "Maria Elena" (Lorenzo Barcelata, Bob Russell) – 2:55
 "Marcheta" (Victor Schertzinger) – 2:22
 "Tzena Tzena Tzena" (Jules Grossman, J. Myron, Mitchell Parish) – 2:04
 "Poinciana" (Nat Simon, Buddy Bernier) – 2:01

Personnel
Chet Atkins – guitar

References

1960 albums
Chet Atkins albums
Albums produced by Chet Atkins
RCA Records albums